Schistura desmotes is a species of ray-finned fish in the stone loach genus Schistura. It is found in Ratchaburi Province of Thailand where it inhabits streams with a moderate current and a gravel or stone substrate. The specific name desmotes mean "prisoner" and refers to the 7–9 broad dark-brown transverse bands on the fish's body, which reminded Fowler of a striped prisoner's uniform.

References 

D
Fish described in 1934